The 2001 Supertaça Cândido de Oliveira was the 23rd edition of the Supertaça Cândido de Oliveira, the annual Portuguese football season-opening match contested by the winners of the previous season's top league and cup competitions (or cup runner-up in case the league- and cup-winning club is the same). The match took place on the 4 August 2001 at the Estádio do Rio Ave FC in Vila do Conde, and was contested between 2000–01 Primeira Liga winners Boavista, and 2000–01 Taça de Portugal winners Porto.

In Portugal, the final was televised live on RTP. Porto would defeat Boavista 1–0. A 22nd minute headed goal from central defender Jorge Andrade was sufficient for the Dragões to defeat Os Axadrezados and claim the Supertaça Cândido de Oliveira for a 12th time in their history.

Match

Details

References

Supertaça Cândido de Oliveira
2001–02 in Portuguese football
FC Porto matches
Boavista F.C. matches